Chris Noonan (born 14 November 1952) is an Australian filmmaker and actor. He is best known for the family film Babe (1995), for which he was nominated for the Academy Award for Best Director and Academy Award for Best Adapted Screenplay.

Biography
Encouraged by his father, Noonan made his first short film, Could It Happen Here? set at North Sydney Boys High School when he was sixteen. It won a prize at the Sydney Film Festival and was later screened on Australian television. On leaving school in 1970 Noonan went to work for the Commonwealth Film Unit (now Film Australia), as a production assistant, assistant editor, production manager and assistant director making short films and documentaries.

In 1973 Noonan was in the inaugural intake on the directors' course (along with Gillian Armstrong and Phillip Noyce) at the Australian Film Television and Radio School. In 1974 he returned to Film Australia where he worked on a number of films and documentaries, including working as assistant director on the cult movie The Cars That Ate Paris. In 1976 he directed Film Australia's documentary series, "Our Asian Neighbours: India", including a film about Swami Shyam, a teacher of Vedant and Meditation living in the Indian Himalayas.

In 1979 he set up his own production company, and in 1980 documented the lives of a troupe of disabled actors, in the acclaimed Stepping Out, which won the UNESCO prize in 1980 and an Australian Film Institute Award for 'Best Documentary' in 1981. He co-wrote and co-directed the Australian mini-series The Cowra Breakout, wrote and directed five episodes of the mini-series, Vietnam, and made his television movie debut with The Riddle of the Stinson.

Noonan served for two years (1987–88) as President of the Australian Screen Directors' Association, and in 1990 was appointed for a three-year term as Chairman of the Australian Film Commission.

In 1995 he wrote the screenplay, with George Miller, and directed the film, Babe, his first theatrical feature. The film earned $US280m in its 18-language world theatrical release, a further $US217m in international video sales and was nominated for seven Academy Awards (including nominations for Noonan for directing and writing). The film was recognized with many other honors, including BAFTA Award nominations for Film and Adapted Screenplay.

He co-produced the popular Davida Allen telemovie, Feeling Sexy, in 1999. 

In 2006 he directed the biographical film, Miss Potter, based on the life of children's author Beatrix Potter. Noonan has two further projects including Zebras, a drama set in the final days of apartheid South Africa and The Third Witch, a retelling of William Shakespeare's Macbeth from the perspective of one of the witches, in development.

Filmography

Film

Executive Producer
 Feeling Sexy (1999) 
 Ticket Out (2010)

Television
TV movies

TV series

Other credits

References

External links
 

1952 births
Australian film directors
Australian film producers
Australian screenwriters
Living people
Writers from Sydney